Neil Denari (b. Fort Worth, Texas September 3, 1957) is an American architect, professor, and author. Based since 1988 in Los Angeles, Denari emerged in New York during the 1980s with a series of theoretical projects and texts based on the collapse of the machine aesthetic of Modernism. His office, Neil M. Denari Architects (NMDA) is dedicated to exploring the realms of architecture, design, urbanism, and all aspects of contemporary life. As a teacher for more than 20 years, Denari has held visiting professorships at UC Berkeley, Columbia, Princeton, University of Pennsylvania, and the University of Texas at Arlington. Since 2002, he has taught at UCLA where he is a tenured professor.

Early life and education
Denari received a Bachelor's degree in Architecture in 1980 from the University of Houston and in 1982, he earned a Master's degree from Harvard University. While at Harvard, he studied the philosophy of science and also art theory with the expatriate Austrian artist Paul Rotterdam, whom Denari has cited as his most influential teacher.

Career

After graduate studies, Denari worked for five months as an intern in Paris for Aerospatiale – now Airbus – one of Europe's largest aviation contractors. Following this, Denari lived and worked in New York City from 1983 to 1988, first at James Stewart Polshek & Partners as a senior designer, before beginning to teach at Columbia University’s Graduate School of Architecture and Planning in 1986. During this five-year period in New York, Denari produced a series of self generated projects and participated in numerous exhibitions, most notably at P.S. 1 in Long Island City in the fall of 1986. That year he also won a Fellowship from the New York Foundation for the Arts. In 2008, Denari was given an Award from the American Academy of Arts and Letters for his strong personal direction in design. In 2009 he was the recipient of a 2009 Fellows Award from United States Artists.

Denari founded his firm in Los Angeles in 1988. He began teaching at SCI-Arc that year and from 1997 to 2002, was the Director at this school of architecture. Denari has used the city of Los Angeles as a resource and laboratory for urban and cultural experiments.  In 1990 and 1991, he worked on several small projects and taught architecture in Tokyo. This period of time, prior to the collapse of the Japanese bubble economy, gave Denari the opportunity to study both the historical and contemporary aspects of Japanese culture.  These experiences have had a continued impact on his work.

Gyroscopic Horizons, a book written by Denari documenting his architectural projects as well as his ideas and theories on contemporary culture, was jointly published in September 1999 by Princeton Architectural Press and Thames and Hudson. Currently Denari is at work on a monograph entitled Speculations On which will be published in 2011 by AADCU of Beijing.

Denari's drawings and models are part of seven permanent collections: Cooper-Hewitt Museum, San Francisco Museum of Modern Art (SFMOMA), Fonds régional d'art contemporain (FRAC) in Orléans, France, Museum of Modern Art (MOMA) in New York, Denver Art Museum, Heinz Architectural Center of Carnegie Museum of Art, and Museum of Contemporary Art, Sydney. In 2002, Denari's work was chosen to be a part of the National Academy of Design’s annual exhibition in New York, where he also received both the Samuel Morse Medal and the Richard Recchia Prize for his work.

References

External links
 Neil M. Denari Architects website
 Neil Denari on the radio
 Review of the Fluoroscape Installation
 Interview with Neil Denari
 Interview with Neil Denari while he was director of SCI-Arc by Ben Flatman
 Neil Denari @ work. An interview by Orhan Ayyuce 9/2007, Archinect

Postmodern architects
1957 births
Living people
Southern California Institute of Architecture faculty
UCLA School of the Arts and Architecture faculty
Columbia University faculty
Harvard Graduate School of Design alumni
University of Houston alumni
Architects from Los Angeles
Architects from Texas
Educators from Greater Los Angeles
20th-century American architects
21st-century American architects